Paku (Bakau) is an Austronesian language spoken in four villages in the East Barito Regency of Central Kalimantan province, Indonesia. It is closely related to the Malagasy language spoken on Madagascar. Most of the remaining speakers are also fluent in other languages. The use of the language is decreasing and speakers are increasingly shifting to Ma'anyan, a lingua franca of East Barito. In 2018, it was estimated there was about 50 speakers of the language in the villages of Tampa, Tarinsing, Bantei Napu, and Kalamus in the regency of East Barito.

References

Further reading 

 
 
 

East Barito languages
Languages of Indonesia
Endangered Austronesian languages